Francis Lyndon Evelyn  (24 May 1859 – 8 December 1910) was a Welsh first-class cricketer.

The son of Francis Evelyn senior, he was born at Presteigne in May 1859. He was educated at Rugby School,  before going up to Oriel College, Oxford. While studying at Oxford, he played first-class cricket for Oxford University in 1880 and 1881, making five appearances. He struggled as a batsman in his five matches, scoring just 33 runs with a high score of 10.

After graduating from Oxford, Evelyn was commissioned into the Herefordshire Light Infantry as a second lieutenant in December 1880. By 1884, he was serving in the Shropshire Light Infantry as a lieutenant, resigning his commission in April 1884. Evelyn served as a deputy lieutenant for Herefordshire in 1885, before serving as the High Sheriff of Radnorshire in 1887. He also served as a justice of the peace for Radnorshire. Evelyn died in December 1910 at Kinsham, Herefordshire. His youngest brother was the Welsh football international Edward Evelyn, while his middle brother was the historian William Arthur Evelyn.

References

External links

1859 births
1910 deaths
Welsh military personnel
People from Presteigne
Sportspeople from Powys
People educated at Rugby School
Alumni of Oriel College, Oxford
Welsh cricketers
Oxford University cricketers
Herefordshire Light Infantry officers
King's Shropshire Light Infantry officers
Deputy Lieutenants of Herefordshire
High Sheriffs of Radnorshire
Welsh justices of the peace
English cricketers of 1864 to 1889